Magical Girl Lyrical Nanoha is a fantasy adventure anime and manga series written by Masaki Tsuzuki. Set in a fictional universe, its storyline follows several different users of magic as they become involved with incidents related to powerful ancient artifacts. Four anime series have been produced by Seven Arcs between 2004 and 2009 with music direction by Toshiki Kameyama. The first season anime television series titled Magical Girl Lyrical Nanoha directed by Akiyuki Shinbo was broadcast in 2004 spanning thirteen episodes. The second season of the anime series titled Magical Girl Lyrical Nanoha A's directed by Keizō Kusakawa was broadcast in 2005 spanning thirteen episodes. A third season of the anime series titled Magical Girl Lyrical Nanoha StrikerS directed by Keizō Kusakawa was broadcast in 2007 spanning twenty-six episodes. An anime film readaptation of the first season of the anime series was released in 2010. The discography for these series consist of ten soundtrack albums, three compilation albums, nine maxi singles, one studio album, and fourteen drama CDs.

The discography for the Magical Girl Lyrical Nanoha franchise was all produced by King Records. The ten soundtrack albums composed by Hiroaki Sano were released by King Records between 2005 and 2008. The eight maxi singles released by both King Records and Konami Digital Entertainment between 2004 and 2007 that each either contain a piece of theme music or an insert song featured in the many anime series. The one studio album was released by King Records in 2004 containing an insert song featured in the first season of the anime series. Three compilation albums collecting various tracks used throughout the three anime television series were released from 2007 to 2009 and fourteen drama CDs released between 2004 and 2009.

Magical Girl Lyrical Nanoha

Innocent Starter
"Innocent Starter" is a maxi single performed by Nana Mizuki first released on October 6, 2004 by King Records, bearing the catalog number KICM-1115. The lyrics, composition, and arrangement for the single are provided by Nana Mizuki, Tsutomu Ōhira, Takahiro Iida, and Chiyomaru Shikura. The single contains 6 tracks in regular and instrumental versions. The track "Innocent Starter" is featured as the opening theme in the anime television series Magical Girl Lyrical Nanoha. It peak ranked 9th on the Oricon singles chart and remained on the chart for eight weeks.

Little Wish (Lyrical Step)
 is a maxi single performed by Tamura Yukari first released on October 21, 2004 by Konami Digital Entertainment bearing the catalog number KMCM-40. The song "Little Wish (Lyrical Step)" was featured as the ending theme to the anime Magical Girl Lyrical Nanoha. The lyrics, composition, and arrangement for the single are provided by Karen Shiina, Masatomo Ota, Kanade Kotowa, and Kazuya Komatsu. The single contains three tracks. Its A-side "Little Wish (Lyrical Step)" is featured as the ending theme in the anime television series Magical Girl Lyrical Nanoha. Its B-sides are titled  and "Sweet Darlin' ". It peak ranked 32nd on the Oricon singles chart and remained on the chart for four weeks.

Alive & Kicking
Alive & Kicking is a studio album performed by Nana Mizuki first released on December 8, 2004 by King Records bearing the catalog number KICS-1125. The lyrics, composition, and arrangement for the album are provided by Yabuki Toshirō, Nana Mizuki, sutomu Ōhira, Takahiro Iida, Yūmao, Noriyasu Agematsu, Akimitsu Honma, Kenji Kitajima and Naoko. The album contains fourteen tracks and covers a duration of 65:08. It contains the track "Take a Shot" that was featured as an insert song in episode twelve of anime series Magical Girl Lyrical Nanoha. It also featured the track "Innocent Starter", which was used as the opening theme for the same series.

Magical Girl Lyrical Nanoha Original Soundtrack
The  containing all the tracks composed by Hiroaki Sano used as background music for the anime television series Magical Girl Lyrical Nanoha. It was first released on May 11, 2005 by King Records bearing the catalog number KICA-693. It contains forty-one tracks and covers a duration of 1:13:34. It features short versions of the opening and ending themes for the anime series performed Nana Mizuki and Tamura Yukari respectively as well as the two tracks containing the lines of dialogue spoken by the two intelligent devices Raising Heart and Bardiche performed by Donna Burke and Kevin J. England respectively. It peak ranked 117th on the Oricon albums chart and remained on the chart for one week.-

Magical Girl Lyrical Nanoha The Movie 1st Original Soundtrack
The original soundtrack for the Magical Girl Lyrical Nanoha The Movie 1st was composed by Hiroaki Sano and was released in two discs by King Records on January 23, 2010. It covers forty-six tracks.

Track listing

Magical Girl Lyrical Nanoha A's

Eternal Blaze
"Eternal Blaze" is a maxi single by Nana Mizuki first released on October 19, 2005 by King Records bearing the catalog number KICM-1148. The lyrics, composition, and arrangement for the single are provided by Nana Mizuki, Noriyasu Agematsu, Bee, Hitoshi Fujima, Ryōji Sonoda, and Wataru Masachi. The single contains three tracks. Its A-side "Eternal Blaze" is featured as the opening theme in the anime television series Magical Girl Lyrical Nanoha A's. Its B-sides are titled "Rush & Dash!" and "Inside of Mind". It peak-ranked 2nd on the Oricon singles chart and remained on the chart for fifteen weeks.

Spiritual Garden
"Spiritual Garden" is a maxi single by Yukari Tamura first released on October 26, 2005 by Konami Digital Entertainment bearing the catalog number GBCM-7. The lyrics, composition, and arrangement for the single are provided by Yukiko Mitsui, Masatomo Ota, Manami Fujino, Yukari Hashimoto, Ucio, and Toshimichi Tsuge. The single contains three tracks. Its A-side "Spiritual Garden" is featured as the ending theme in the anime television series Magical Girl Lyrical Nanoha A's. Its B-sides are titled "Cutie Cutie" and "Travelling with a Sheep". It peak ranked 10th on the Oricon singles chart and remained on the chart for five weeks.

Super Generation
"Super Generation" is a maxi single by Nana Mizuki first released on January 18, 2006 by King Records bearing the catalog number KICM-1156. The lyrics, composition, and arrangement for the single are provided by Nana Mizuki, Junpei Fujita, Noriyasu Agematsu, Yamato Itō, Nittoku Inōe. The single contains three tracks. Its B-side "Brave Phoenix" was featured as an insert song to episode twelve of the anime television series Magical Girl Lyrical Nanoha A's. Its A-side is titled "Super Generation" and its other B-side is titled . It peak ranked 6th on the Oricon singles chart and remained on the chart for six weeks.

Magical Girl Lyrical Nanoha A's original soundtracks
The original soundtrack for the anime television series Magical Girl Lyrical Nanoha A's was composed by Hiroaki Sano and was released across six soundtrack albums that were each bundled with its respective DVD compilation volume that was released for the series. King Records released the six CDs titled Magical Girl Lyrical Nanoha A's Original Soundtrack Plus Vol.1~6 between January 25, 2006 and June 21, 2006. In total, the six CDs contain fifty-seven tracks and cover a duration of 43:54. Each CD features tracks containing background music used during the anime series as well as the lines of dialogue that each intelligent device that the protagonists and antagonists of the anime series use performed by their respective voice actors.

Track listing

Magical Girl Lyrical Nanoha The Movie 2nd A's Original Soundtrack
The original soundtrack for Magical Girl Lyrical Nanoha The Movie 2nd A's was composed by Misa Chūjō and was released in two discs. King Records released the original soundtrack on July 14, 2012. It contains fifty-seven tracks and covers a duration of 1:55:55.

Track listing

Magical Girl Lyrical Nanoha StrikerS

Secret Ambition
"Secret Ambition" is a maxi single by Nana Mizuki first released on April 18, 2007 by King Records bearing the catalog number KICM-1199. The lyrics, composition, and arrangement for the single are provided by Nana Mizuki, Chiyomaru Shikura, Hitoshi Fujima, Noriyasu Agematsu, Chisato Nishimura, and Shinya Saitō. The single contains six tracks in both regular and instrumental versions. Its A-side "Secret Ambition" is featured as the first opening theme in the anime television series Magical Girl Lyrical Nanoha StrikerS and is used for episodes one through seventeen. Its B-sides are titled "Heart-Shaped Chant" and "Level Hi!". It peak ranked 2nd on the Oricon singles chart and remained on the chart for nineteen weeks.

Hoshizora no Spica
 is a maxi single by Yukari Tamura first released on May 9, 2007 by King Records bearing the catalog number KICM-1210. The lyrics, composition, and arrangement for the single are provided by Karen Shiina, Noriyasu Agematsu, Mika Watanabe, Dux, and Hayato Tanaka. The single contains three tracks. Its A-side "Hoshizora no Spica" was featured as the first ending theme in the anime television series Magical Girl Lyrical Nanoha StrikerS and is used from episodes one through fourteen. Its B-sides are titled "Sensitive Venes" and "Melody". It peak ranked 7th on the Oricon singles chart and remained on the chart for nine weeks.

Massive Wonders
"Massive Wonders" is a maxi single by Nana Mizuki first released on August 22, 2007 by King Records bearing the catalog number KICM-1211. The lyrics, composition, and arrangement for the single are provided by Nana Mizuki, Toshirō Yabuki, Bee, Noriyasu Agematsu, and Hibiki. The single contains six tracks in both regular and instrumental versions. Its A-side "Massive Wonders" is featured as the second opening theme in the anime television series Magical Girl Lyrical Nanoha StrikerS and is used from episodes eighteen through twenty-six. Its B-side "Pray" is featured as an insert song in episode twenty-four of the same anime series. Its other B-side is titled "Happy Drive". It peak ranked 4th on the Oricon singles chart and remained on the chart for twelve weeks.

Beautiful Amulet
"Beautiful Amulet" is a maxi single by Tamura Yukari first released on August 1, 2007 by King Records bearing the catalog number KICM-1212. The lyrics, composition, and arrangement for the single are provided by Karen Shiina, Masatomo Ota, Yukiko Mitsui, Marhy, Dux, Miku Hazuki, Isozaki Takeshi, and Kazuya Komatsu. The single contains four tracks. Its A-side "Beautiful Amulet" is featured as the second ending theme in the anime television series Magical Girl Lyrical Nanoha StrikerS and is used from episodes fifteen to twenty-six. It peak ranked 11th on the Oricon singles chart and remained on the chart for seven weeks.

Magical Girl Lyrical Nanoha StrikerS Original Soundtracks
The original soundtrack for the anime television series Magical Girl Lyrical Nanoha StrikerS was composed by Hiroaki Sano and was released across three soundtrack albums titled Magical Girl Lyrical Nanoha StrikerS Original Soundtrack Plus Vol.1~3. The three CDs were released between July 25, 2007 and March 26, 2008 alongside the first, fifth, and last of the nine DVD volumes that compile the anime's twenty-six episodes. In total, the three CDs contain seventy-eight tracks and cover a duration of 2:00:37. Each CD features tracks containing the background music used during the anime series.

Track listing

Drama CDs

Compilation albums

Magical Girl Lyrical Nanoha A's Sound Stage Vocal Best Collection
 is a compilation album compiling tracks composed by Hiroaki Sano for the two anime series Magical Girl Lyrical Nanoha and Magical Girl Lyrical Nanoha A's. It was sold exclusively during August 2006 at Comiket 70. It contains twelve tracks.

Magical Girl Lyrical Nanoha StrikerS Sound Stage Vocal Best Collection
 is a compilation album first released on March 4, 2009 by King Records bearing the catalog number KICA-966. The album contains twelve tracks. It compiles the "best" tracks that feature vocal performance contained within the four drama CDs released for the anime series Magical Girl Lyrical Nanoha StrikerS titled Magical Girl Lyrical Nanoha StrikerS Sound Stage 01~04. It peak ranked 40th on the Oricon albums chart and remained on the chart for four weeks.

Magical Girl Lyrical Nanoha StrikerS Original Soundtrack Plus LPIII SA

References

External links
 List of DVD and CD releases on the Japanese Nanoha Wiki 

Anime soundtracks
Albums
Film and television discographies
Discographies of Japanese artists